Belo Monte is a municipality located in the western of the Brazilian state of Alagoas. Its population is 6,710 (2020) and its area is 334 km².

The municipality was designated a priority area for conservation and sustainable use when the Caatinga Ecological Corridor was created in 2006.

References

Municipalities in Alagoas